Chegga is an abandoned fort in the very northeastern part of Mauritania, close to the borders with Algeria and Mali. It consists of a mosque and a military fort. It has been a caravan stop for centuries. There are neolithic rock carvings in the oued 500 metres away from the fort.

References

Populated places in Mauritania
Algeria–Mauritania border crossings